is a Japanese manga series written by Satoshi Miyakawa and illustrated by Kei Itō.  An anime television series adaptation by Gonzo was broadcast from April 3 to December 25, 2018.

On January 18, 2020, it was announced the manga will end in three chapters.

Plot
The series is a comedy about the daily life of Subaru Ichinose, a pilot on the space battleship Tiramisu, who lives and eats in his fighter's cockpit because he can't stand the company of others.

Characters

Narrator

Media

Manga
Satoshi Miyakawa launched the manga, with art by Kei Itō, on Shinchosha's Kurage Bunch website on October 9, 2015.

Volumes

Anime
An anime television series adaptation premiered on April 3, 2018, and was broadcast on Tokyo MX, Sun TV, BS11, and AT-X, before streaming on Hikari TV Channel.  The series is twenty-six episodes long and also has seven OVAs.  The series is directed by Hiroshi Ikehata and written by Yū Satō, with animation by studio Gonzo.  Ai Yokoyama provides character designs for the anime.  Kaito Ishikawa (the voice actor for Subaru) performs both the opening theme song "Breakthrough" and the ending theme song "DURANDAL" for the first season. Crunchyroll is simulcasting the series while Funimation has licensed the series and streams it with an English dub.

At the conclusion of the first season broadcast, a second season was announced and aired from October 2 to December 25, 2018. Kaito Ishikawa returned to performed both the opening theme song "Gravity Heart" and the ending theme song "DURANDAL New ver." for the second season

Season 1

Season 2 (Zwei)

Notes

References

External links
  
  
 

Anime series based on manga
Comedy anime and manga
Funimation
Gonzo (company)
Science fiction anime and manga
Seinen manga
Shinchosha manga
Tokyo MX original programming